G. Veeraiyan is an Indian politician and former Member of the Legislative Assembly of Tamil Nadu.

Biography
He was elected to the Tamil Nadu legislative assembly as a Communist Party of India (Marxist) candidate from Nagapattinam constituency in 1984 and 1989 elections.

References

Communist Party of India (Marxist) politicians from Tamil Nadu
Living people
Year of birth missing (living people)
Tamil Nadu MLAs 1985–1989